The Canton of Arques is a former canton situated in the Pas-de-Calais département and in the Nord-Pas-de-Calais region of France. It was disbanded following the French canton reorganisation which came into effect in March 2015. It had a total of 20,550 inhabitants (2012, without double counting).

Geography 
This canton was centred on the town of Arques in the arrondissement of Saint-Omer. The altitude varies from 0m at (Saint-Omer) to 95m at (Helfaut) for an average of 28m.

The canton comprised 5 communes:
Arques
Blendecques
Campagne-lès-Wardrecques
Helfaut
Saint-Omer (partly)

See also
 Arrondissement of Saint-Omer
 Cantons of Pas-de-Calais
 Communes of Pas-de-Calais

References

Arques
2015 disestablishments in France
States and territories disestablished in 2015